Leonard Morris (1748 – May 17, 1831) was an early American pioneer, soldier, and lawman, who was one of the founders of Charleston, West Virginia in 1788., and named as a trustee of Charleston when the town was incorporated by the Virginia House of Delegates in 1794. Leonard is the brother of Virginia House Representative William Morris, Henry Morris, Captain John Morris, and uncle of US Congressman Calvary Morris, and Bishop Thomas Asbury Morris

Appointment to Justice

On October 6, 1789, the Virginia House of Delegates appointed Leonard Morris as Justice of the newly established Kanawha County, and was sworn in as member of the County Court. The first official court appearance in Kanawha County was held in the house of Colonel George Clendenin. On this occasion several of the newly appointed Justices were sworn in as members of the Court including Thomas Lewis Jr., and Daniel Boone.  In 1794 Morris was named Commissioner for Kanawha County, and in 1798 named Sheriff of Kanawha County.

Revolutionary War

Leonard Morris fought in the Battle of Point Pleasant under Colonel Andrew Lewis (soldier) in Lord Dunmore's War in 1774. During the Battle of Point Pleasant and through the American Revolution Leonard commanded Fort Morris (also known as Kelly's Post). . The Morris Fort was already established by 1774 near the mouth of Catfish Shoals on the Kanawha River twelve miles away from Leonard Morris’ Fort. Fort Morris was built by Leonard, William, and their father William Sr in 1774; but Leonard thought it would be strategic to have a secondary fort further down the Kanawha River. Both of these forts were established prior to Colonel Lewis and Lord Dunmore's men coming to engage with Chief Cornstalk. Morris, and five of his brothers joined Colonel Lewis on the march to Point Pleasant and was in the battle on October 10, 1774. Morris was a spy during the American Revolution, tracking hostile Indian movements in Greenbrier and Kanawha along with his brother Captain William Morris and brother-in-law John Jones until the duration of the war. Morris also worked alongside Lt. John Young who was newly commissioned under Captain William Morris's Company as a spy.

In 1774 while occupying Fort Morris, Leonard received from the Governor of Virginia, Lord Dunmore, a guard of ten soldiers who remained until the settlers were safe from Indians. In one of the last raids the Indians kidnapped Sallie, one of Leonard's maids, and though Morris and twenty men followed the Indians as far as Guyandotte they were unable to obtain her release. The war party was of a couple hundred, and their ransom was too great that they could not get Sallie back.

On August 10, 1789, Leonard Morris and William Morris were listed as having sold, and provided war materials amounting to three-thousand seven hundred and eighty-two rations for Colonel George Clendenin, 26 Privates, 2 Sergeants, one Ensign, one Lieutenant, and one Captain from March to July 1789 in support of the Northwest Indian Wars for the Kanawha County Militia Rangers, later renamed in October 1789 as Morris' Company of Rangers. Leonard Morris's farm and stock raising was instrumental to the war effort, from May 1791 Leonard's Brother Captain John Morris, Commander of the Morris' Company of Rangers provided Leonard's farm with soldiers until September 30, 1791, protecting the lands from hostile forces. The Ranger company was listed in a March 24, 1792 report to the Governor of Virginia, Henry Lee III as "having adopted full and effectual measures for the defense of the Western Frontier."

Leonard Morris, while Sheriff of Kanawha, testified in court regarding a land dispute between claimants of a 250-acre tract of land, previously patented to General George Washington and General Lewis that, in 1775, he saw surveyors making a survey of the tract. The patent was later granted to Washington and Lewis, and signed by Thomas Jefferson, Governor of Virginia.   

"And the said Leonard Morris, being produced as a witness for the plaintiff, after being first duly sworn, deposeth and saith: That in the year 1775, this deponent was residing on Kanawha river about six miles from Burning Spring Tract. During that year, Messrs. Samuel Lewis, a surveyor, Colonel John Stuart, of Greenbrier, and Thomas Bullitt were on the Kanawha surveying lands, and procured from out of this deponent's family, Mungo Price and his son as chain carriers; that after the party returned from surveying, this deponent understood from them that they had surveyed the Burning Spring Tract for the late General George Washington and Andrew Lewis. This deponent, with the exception of some periods when the Indian wars made it hazardous to keep a family on Kanawha, has made it his principal residence since 1775. Sometimes during the Indian troubles, this deponent's family resided altogether in Greenbrier."

Life
Leonard Morris was born in Culpeper, Colony of Virginia and is the son of William Morris and Elizabeth Stapp (Stipps). Leonard had sixteen children, six by his first wife Margaret Price - John, Meredith, Mary, Sarah, Elizabeth, and Leonard, Jr.; and ten children by his second wife Margaret Larkin - Charles, Nancy, Parthenia, Joshua, Hiram, Peter, Andrew, Cynthia, Madison and Dickinson. Leonard Morris owned 18 slaves in Kanawha County, Virginia in 1820. In 1836, Mararget Larkin erected a Church in Leonard Morris's honor, Ebenezer Chapel (Marmet, West Virginia) which was built by Morris's slaves. Leonard Morris is the founder of the City of Marmet, as well as Lens Creek on the Kanawha River

References 

1748 births
1831 deaths
American city founders
American slave owners
People from Charleston, West Virginia
People from Kanawha County, West Virginia
People in Dunmore's War
Trustees of populated places in Virginia
Virginia sheriffs
West Virginia pioneers